Springvale is an unincorporated community in Springvale Township, Isanti County, Minnesota, United States.

The community is located at the junction of Isanti County Road 6 and Flamingo Street NW.  County Roads 1 and 14 are nearby.  Stanchfield Creek flows through the community.  Springvale is located northwest of Cambridge.

References

 Official State of Minnesota Highway Map – 2013/2014 edition

Unincorporated communities in Minnesota
Unincorporated communities in Isanti County, Minnesota